Haikou is the capital of Hainan Province, China.

Haikou may also refer to:
 Haikou, Fuqing, town in Fuqing County, Fuzhou City, Fujian, China
 Haikou Subdistrict (formerly, Haikou Town), in Xishan District, Kunming, Yunnan, China
 Several other towns named Haikou; see :zh:海口镇

Various objects near Haikou, Hainan
 Haikou Bay
 Haikou Meilan International Airport
 Haikou Xiuying Port
 Haikou New Port

Ships
 Chinese destroyer Haikou (171)

See also
 Haiku (disambiguation)